Communauté d'agglomération de l'Espace Sud de la Martinique is an intercommunal structure in the Martinique overseas department and region of France. It was created in December 2004. Its seat is in Sainte-Luce. Its area is 409.1 km2. Its population was 116,168 in 2017.

Composition
The communauté d'agglomération consists of the following 12 communes:

Les Anses-d'Arlet
Le Diamant
Ducos
Le François
Le Marin
Rivière-Pilote
Rivière-Salée
Sainte-Anne
Sainte-Luce
Saint-Esprit
Les Trois-Îlets
Le Vauclin

References

Espace Sud de la Martinique
Espace Sud de la Martinique